Colonel John Alexander Bridgland (December 3, 1826 − July 29, 1890) was an American diplomat, businessman and soldier.

Early Beginnings 

John Alexander Bridgland was born December 3, 1826 at Lynchburg, Virginia to Alexander Bridgland, a wealthy landowner, planter and merchant and Harriet Susannah Thornton. His grandfather was a prominent racehorse owner, Sterling C. Thornton and his great-grandfather was William Thornton (Virginia burgess) himself a great-grandson of William Thornton (immigrant). At the age of twelve his father died and like many planters had used his landholdings as collateral for future expectations and as such the family was forced into bankruptcy. As a result of his father's untimely death he was limited in the liberal education many of his relations was afforded. He quickly took up work overseeing properties and handling mercantile business of his mother siblings and cousins.

Mexico and Indiana

Bridgland began his military career through business when the Thornton family instructed him to deliver horses from Virginia to relations serving under General Winfield Scott in Vera Cruz during the Mexican–American War.  Bridgland was shipwrecked off the coast of Mexico but managed to meet up with the U.S. Army as Scott marched into Mexico City. He remained in Mexico with the army until they reached New Orleans where he contracted Yellow Fever. Upon recovery he obtained passage by steamer to Cincinnati where he took employment in the wholesale of tobacco with the expectation of returning to Virginia. Finding great success in the mid-west he eventually set up a mercantile trade business in Richmond, Indiana. His newfound wealth afforded him to build a large home, marry and provide his family with the life they had lost on the death of his father. He took great interest in Indiana politics starting as a Whig and by 1860 becoming an active supporter of the Republican party and its Presidential candidate, Abraham Lincoln.

Civil War

At the outbreak of the Civil War Bridgland received a commission of colonel of the 2nd Regiment Indiana Cavalry from Governor Morton. His commission was in part for his experience during the Mexican-American War and as a preeminent breeder of fine horses. He fought for the Union in its western campaign at notable battles such as Shiloh and the occupation of Nashville.  He resigned his commission in late 1862 due to health issues but maintained active support of the Army. His mother and five of his six sisters remained in Virginia during the war with several of his brothers-in-law serving for the Confederacy.

Post war life and diplomacy

Bridgland's business was heavily effected by post-war inflation and he worked actively to rebuild his wealth. He was able to do so and again took active interest in politics and veterans affairs. He regularly traveled to New York and Washington and became well acquainted with other politicians and military figures particularly with General William Tecumseh Sherman. In 1873, President Ulysses S. Grant appointed him U.S. Consul at Le Havre in France. He served as Consul until 1882.

Horse breeding and training

Bridgland was an avid horseman his entire life, a passion adopted from his grandfather Sterling Thornton. During his period as consul he advocated for American horse industry to broker a deal to sell American horses to the French Army. In addition to selling horses in Europe, Bridgland two stallions, three colts and two fillies from some of the best stables in England.

Family

John Bridgland married June 14, 1849 at Richmond, Indiana to Caroline Elizabeth Gilbert (1826–1880)who was originally from Pennsylvania. He never remarried after her death but in his retirement had a live-in companion named Mary Hannegan. Bridgland had one child, Harriet Augusta Bidgland born in 1853. Harriet Bridgland married at Seville, Spain Carlos Rodríguez de Trujillo y Malibrán with whom she had two children, John Alexander Rodríguez de Trujillo and Caroline Rodríguez de Trujillo. She and her family resided in London, England and Seville, Spain. Bridgland's descendants are not known to have ever returned to the United States.

References

1826 births
1890 deaths
People from Lynchburg, Virginia
19th-century American diplomats
Union Army officers